Park Seong-ha (born 17 April 1966) is a South Korean wrestler. He competed in the men's freestyle 130 kg at the 1992 Summer Olympics.

References

1966 births
Living people
South Korean male sport wrestlers
Olympic wrestlers of South Korea
Wrestlers at the 1992 Summer Olympics
Place of birth missing (living people)
20th-century South Korean people